Henrietta Beaufort (1778–1865), earlier Harriet Beaufort, was a botanist born of Anglo-French parents in Ireland. Her Dialogues on Botany for the Use of Young Persons was published in 1819 and aimed to teach plant biology to young readers.

Books 
In her Dialogues on Botany, Beaufort considered it important to delay the teachings of the Linnaean system of classification until she had first provided the basis, physiology. There were no pictures in her book, because she thought it was important for readers to study nature and not the representation of it. She was criticized by contemporaries for this.

In 1829 John Murray published her Bertha’s Journal, without her name appearing as author.

Family 
Beaufort's father, the Reverend Daniel Beaufort, a founding member of the Royal Irish Academy, was her inspiration to become a scientist. She had two sisters, Frances and Louisa, and a brother, Francis. Her whole family was interested or connected to science.  Both Henrietta and Louisa wrote books in the hope of supporting their family after their father gave up his clerical position and found himself highly indebted.

When her brother Francis's confidential diary was decoded, after their deaths, it revealed feelings of guilt he felt over having an incestuous relationship with Henrietta.

Publications
Dialogues on Botany for the Use of Young Persons (London, 1819)
Bertha's Journal (London: John Murray, 1829)

References

1778 births
1865 deaths
Women biologists
Hariet Henrietta
Irish women scientists
Irish biologists
19th-century women scientists
19th-century Irish scientists
Irish women botanists